God Dethroned is a Dutch extreme metal band from Beilen, originally formed in 1990.

Biography
God Dethroned was formed in 1990 by singer and guitar player Henri Sattler, with Hans Leegstra (guitar) and Ard de Weerd. Sattler and Leegstra had previously been in Dysentery; Leegstra, quickly after the band formed, left the music scene altogether. They recorded a demo, Christ Hunt, in 1991, after which Marco Arends joined on bass. Their first album, The Christhunt, was released on the German label Shark. Meanwhile, Arends left (to rejoin Altar) and was replaced by Marcel Beukeveld. The Christhunt did poorly; the label had refused to feature a dissected rat on the cover and did not promote the record at all. Dethroned went on hiatus the following year, in part because Sattler's anti-Christian sympathy was not shared by all, and Sattler formed a new group called Ministry of Terror. In 1996, after that band's 1994 album Fall of Life and a supporting European tour (with Impaled Nazarene), Sattler re-formed God Dethroned with guitarist Jens van der Valk (who did not share Sattler's anti-Christian sympathies either), bassist Beef, and drummer Roel Sanders. With this lineup a deal was signed with Metal Blade, and they issued The Grand Grimoire in Europe in 1997; the album was released in the U.S. the following year, along with a re-issue of The Christhunt, which featured the original cover art, with the dissected rat.

The Grand Grimorie did much better than The Christhunt did, and the band soon entered into a sort of high point. The lineup of Sattler, Van Der Valk, Beef and Sanders would record the album Bloody Blasphemy, which many fans of the band consider to be their best work to date. Successful tours and shows with bands like Marduk, Immortal, and Deicide would later follow. After Bloody Blasphemy, Sanders soon left the band and was replaced by Puerto Rican drummer Tony Laureano.  Laureano played with the band up till 2003, when he received an offer to join the American death metal band Nile. He would record only one album with the band: 2001's Ravenous.  

A new drummer was found, Ariën Van Weesenbeek, and the band entered the studio at the end of 2002 to record Into the Lungs of Hell.  More problems began to follow, as Beef and Jens were tired with the direction of the band and wanted to push for a more heavy and extreme sound with more anti-Christian lyrics (themes that had begun to start to fade to an extent on Ravenous), whereas Sattler wanted to keep the band at a more melodic and darker sound with lyrics focused more on darkness, horror, nihilism, and other themes. After the recording and a short amount of touring for Into the Lungs of Hell, both the bassist and guitarist left the band, and Henri Sattler had to go look out for members once again. Bassist Henk Zinger was quickly brought into the fold, and Ariën van Weesenbeek recommended Belgian guitarist Isaac Delahaye to the band.  This lineup would finish up the remaining tour dates and would go back into the studio to record another album, 2005's The Lair of the White Worm.

After touring for a little while, the band then went back into the studio with legendary producer Rick Rubin, and released The Toxic Touch in 2006 through American.

In January 2008, two personnel changes were made. Since Ariën van Weesenbeek had joined Dutch symphonic metal band Epica full-time in December 2007, he was replaced with former drummer Roel Sanders. After a writing period, Passiondale was recorded and released in early 2009. The album's concept is based on The Battle of Passchendaele during World War I. Once the album was completed, auditions were held and Susan Gerl was selected as the new guitar player. Shortly after the release Roel Sanders was asked to leave the band and Michiel Van Der Plicht was brought in.

In 2010, Henri Sattler stated in a Metal Blade Press release:"We are halfway through the writing process for a new album, which we will record starting end of May. First, we'll play on the Killfest tour in the U.S. supporting Overkill together with label mates Woe of Tyrants and many other great bands.

Abigail Williams' axeman Ian Jekelis will take over touring duties for Susan, with whom we parted ways last January. We will announce the name of our new shredder right before we play our first European festival in May"

Shortly after, guitarist Danny Tunker (Prostitute Disfigurement, Detonation) was announced as the new lead guitarist.

The New God Dethroned album Under The Sign Of The Iron Cross was released through Metal Blade on 22 November 2010 and met rave reviews. It marked the first time God Dethroned became 'Album Of The Month' in the Netherlands' Aardschok magazine.

Sattler announced that 2011 will be the last year of the band and their final show will be in December, but they performed at 70000 Tons of Metal festival in January 2012, after which they officially disbanded.

Sattler announced that the band will reunite in 2015, performing at the 70,000 Tons of Metal Festival in January.  While they will only be a "small selection of shows," according to Sattler, the band does have more shows planned for 2015. But later on, God Dethroned played a lot of shows and in 2017 they even recorded a new album The World Ablaze.

The World Ablaze is the third album of the band's World War I trilogy. The album got high ranks in metal charts. With lead guitarist Mike Ferguson and bass guitarist Jeroen Pomper, God Dethroned's newest album, Illuminati was released on 7 February 2020.

Musical style
God Dethroned originally formed as a death metal band. When they reformed in 1996, they switched to blackened death metal and stayed that way until the release of Into the Lungs of Hell, when they shifted to melodic death metal. They are, however, "an important part of the Dutch black metal scene", according to The Encyclopedia of Dutch Black Metal.  Their latest albums saw a return to their original blackened death metal sound.

Members

Current Lineup
Henri "T.S.K." Sattler - vocals, rhythm guitar (1991-1993, 1996-2012, 2015-present)
Michiel Van Der Plicht - drums (2009-2012, 2015-present)
Jeroen Pomper - bass (2015-present)
Dave Meester - lead guitar (2019-present)

Former members
Ard de Weerd - drums (1991-1993)
Hans Leegstra - lead guitar (1991-1993)
Marco Barends - bass (1991-1992)
Marcel Beukeveld - bass (1992-1993; died 2016)
Jens van der Valk - lead guitar (1996-2003)
Beef - bass (1996-2003)
Roel Sanders - drums (1996-1999, 2008-2009)
Tony Laureano - drums (1999-2001)
Ariën van Weesenbeek - drums (2001-2008)
Isaac Delahaye - lead guitar (2003-2009)
Susan Gerl - lead guitar (2009-2010)
Danny Tunker - lead guitar (2010-2012)
Henk Zinger - bass (2003-2012)
Mike Ferguson - lead guitar (2015-2019)

Touring musicians
Ian Jekelis - lead guitar (2010 + 2015)

Timeline

Discography 
 The Christhunt (1992) (Reissued in 1998)
 The Grand Grimoire (1997)
 Bloody Blasphemy (1999)
 Ravenous (2001)
 Into the Lungs of Hell (2003)
 The Lair of the White Worm (2004)
 The Toxic Touch (2006)
 Passiondale (2009)
 Under the Sign of the Iron Cross (2010)
 The World Ablaze (2017)
 Illuminati (2020)

Music videos 
 Necromagnon (1992)
 Under the Golden Wings of Death (1999)
 Villa Vampiria (2001)
 The Lair of the White Worm (2004)
 Poison Fog (2009)
 On the Wrong Side of the Wire (2017)
 The World Ablaze (2017)
 Annihilation Crusade (2017)
 Illuminati (2019)
 Spirit of Beezelebub (2020)
 Book of Lies (2020)
 Asmodevs (2022)

References

https://outburn.com/interviews/god-dethroned-under-pressure/

External links 
 

Dutch heavy metal musical groups
Dutch death metal musical groups
Dutch melodic death metal musical groups
Dutch black metal musical groups
Blackened death metal musical groups
Musical groups established in 1991
Musical groups disestablished in 1993
Musical groups reestablished in 1996
Musical groups disestablished in 2011
Musical quartets
Midden-Drenthe
1991 establishments in the Netherlands
Metal Blade Records artists